The 2011 London Sevens was a rugby union sevens tournament, part of the 2010–11 IRB Sevens World Series. The competition was held from May 21–22 at Twickenham Stadium in England and featured 16 teams.

South Africa won the Cup competition for their second Cup win on the season. New Zealand clinched the season title after advancing to the Cup semi-finals while their nearest competition going into London, England, fell into the Shield competition and earned no series points.

Format 
The tournament consisted of four round-robin pools of four teams. All sixteen teams progressed to the knockout stage. The top two teams from each group progressed to quarter-finals in the main competition, with the winners of those quarter-finals competing in cup semi-finals and the losers competing in plate semi-finals. The bottom two teams from each group progressed to quarter-finals in the consolation competition, with the winners of those quarter-finals competing in bowl semi-finals and the losers competing in shield semi-finals.

Teams 
The following teams participated:

Pool stage

Pool A

Pool B

Pool C

Pool D

Knockout stage

Shield

Bowl

Plate

Cup

Statistics
Points scored by one player

References

External links

2010–11 IRB Sevens World Series
2010–11 in English rugby union
2011
London Sevens
London Sevens